Archery at the 2010 Asian Para Games were held in Aoti Archery Range from December 13 to December 17. There were 9 gold medals in this sport.

Medal summary

Medal table

Men's events

Women's events

Results

Men

Individual Compound Open

Ranking Round
December 13

Knockout round

Individual Compound W1

Ranking Round
December 13

Final

Individual Recurve Standing

Ranking Round
December 13

Knockout round

Individual Recurve W1/W2

Ranking Round
December 13

Knockout round

Team Recurve Open

Ranking Round
December 13

Knockout round

Women

Individual Compound Open

Ranking Round
December 13

Knockout round

Individual Recurve Standing

Ranking Round
December 13

Knockout round

Individual Recurve W1/W2

Ranking Round
December 13

Knockout round

Team Recurve Open

Ranking Round
December 13

Knockout round

See also
 Asian Para Games - Archery

Asian Para Games
Asian Games
2010 Asian Para Games events
2010 Asian Para Games